The 2006 Canadian Soccer League season was the 9th season for the Canadian Soccer League. The season began on May 19, 2006, and concluded on October 15, 2006, with Italia Shooters defeating Serbian White Eagles, 1–0, at Esther Shiner Stadium to win their first CSL Championship. In the regular season Serbia clinched the International Division, and Oakville Blue Devils secured their first National Division title. The league was re-branded as the Canadian Soccer League, and renamed their two existing conferences into the International and National division. The changes brought about an increase in sponsorship, media coverage, and a 50% increase in attendance. The CSL also received greater autonomy from the Ontario Soccer Association. The league struck an agreement with the Toronto Community News which provided coverage for the league and its member clubs through their nine community newspapers.

Changes from 2005 season 
The Canadian Professional Soccer League changed their name to the Canadian Soccer League. Two new conferences were created International, and National, replacing the Eastern, and Western conferences. Vaughan Shooters changed their name to Italia Shooters and Toronto Supra changed their name to Toronto Supra Portuguese.  Both joined the newly created international division, re-kindling the spirit of the National Soccer League. The Serbian White Eagles, and the Caribbean Selects began play as an expansion franchise in the International Conference. The White Eagles played under the same name in the CSL's predecessor league the National Soccer League in 1974. The Hamilton Thunder, and the Durham Storm had their franchises revoked. Most of the matches were scheduled for the weekend in order to save travel expenses for the clubs, and the league eliminated the playoff wildcard match for the host club.

Teams

Final standings

International Division

National Division

CSL Championship playoffs

Quarterfinals

Italia Shooters were given the semi-final spot as a result of a 2-0 forfeit.

Semifinals

CSL Championship

All-Star Game  
Clyde F.C. of the Scottish First Division conducted a Canadian tour, where they played two matches the first match against Windsor Border Stars and the second against a CSL All-Star team assembled by Velemir Crljen. The match was played at Esther Shiner Stadium at North York, Toronto.

Top goal scorers

Updated: September 30, 2006
Source: https://web.archive.org/web/20070203180901/http://cpsl.org/stats.asp

CSL Executive Committee and Staff 
The 2006 CSL Executive Committee.

Awards  

The annual CSL awards ceremony was held at the La Contessa Banquet Hall on October 22, 2006 in North York, Toronto. The majority of the awards were taken by the International Division teams. The league chose Sasa Viciknez as its MVP, a former Serbian football veteran who played in the 1998–99 UEFA Champions League. Romanian import Gabriel Pop took the Golden Boot for the White Eagles. The Goalkeeper of the Year went to George Azcurra of Toronto Croatia, which marked his fifth award a record amount.

Due to his longstanding dedication to the league Toronto Supra Portuguese owner Isac Cambas was given the President of the Year award. Supra's Uarlem Castro was named the Rookie of the Year after finishing as the third highest goalscorer in the league. After defying the odds in the championship final by defeating a team stacked with European football experience, Tony De Thomasis was presented with the Coach of the Year award. Expansion franchise Caribbean Selects were given the Fair Pay award, and Mercy Watfa was named the Referee of the Year.

References

External links
 Rocket Robin's Home Page of the 2006 CSL Season

2006
2006 domestic association football leagues
Canadian Soccer League